Claude Laverdure was Canada's Ambassador Extraordinary and Plenipotentiary to France from 2003 until 2007 and was also ambassador to Luxembourg. He was previously Ambassador to Belgium, the Democratic Republic of Congo, Burundi, Rwanda, Zaire and to Haiti.

He is currently a senior fellow at the University of Ottawa's Graduate School of Public and International Affairs.

External links
 Canadian Embassy in France biography of Claude Laverdure

References 

Ambassadors of Canada to France
French Quebecers
Living people
Université de Montréal alumni
Year of birth missing (living people)
Ambassadors of Canada to Haiti
Place of birth missing (living people)
Ambassadors of Canada to Luxembourg
Ambassadors of Canada to Belgium
Ambassadors of Canada to the Democratic Republic of the Congo
Ambassadors of Canada to Burundi
Ambassadors of Canada to Rwanda